George Edward Lounsbury (May 7, 1838 – August 16, 1904) was an American politician and the 58th Governor of Connecticut from 1899 to 1901.

Early life 
Lounsbury was born in Poundridge, New York on May 7, 1838, the son of Nathan Lounsbury and Delia Scofield. He studied at Yale University and graduated in 1863. He then went to Berkeley Divinity School and graduated in 1866. He partnered with his brothers, Phineas C. Lounsbury, and founded two successful shoe factories - the Lounsbury Brothers Inc., a shoe factory and Lounsbury, Matthewson, and Company.  He was of English ancestry.

Politics 
Lounsbury was a member of the Connecticut Senate representing the 12th District from 1894 to 1898. He became the Governor of Connecticut on January 4, 1899 after winning the 1898 Connecticut gubernatorial election. During his term, he vetoed many bills that helped to reduce the state deficit. He left office on January 9, 1901.

Personal life 
Lounsbury married Frances Josephine Potwin. He also was an Episcopal priest. He died on August 16, 1904, aged 66.

Sources 
 Sobel, Robert and John Raimo. Biographical Directory of the Governors of the United States, 1789-1978. Greenwood Press, 1988.

References 

1838 births
1904 deaths
Berkeley Divinity School alumni
Republican Party Connecticut state senators
Republican Party governors of Connecticut
People from Ridgefield, Connecticut
People from Pound Ridge, New York
19th-century American politicians
19th-century American Episcopalians